Nimbolouk (also Romanized as Nīmbolouḵ) is a new-city in Nimbolouk District, in Qaen County, South Khorasan Province, Iran. At the 2006 census, its population was 3,886, with a total of 946 families.

The last name of Nimbolouk city has been Eslamabad Romanized as Eslāmābād. In 2005, its name has been changed to the new one.

References 

Populated places in Qaen County

Cities in South Khorasan Province